The Zamboanga Peninsula Valientes MLV are a Filipino professional basketball team based in Zamboanga City, which has played in multiple national and regional leagues since its inception.

History
The Zamboanga Valientes was established in 2006 by Lando Navarro as a means to give a platform for Zamboangueño basketball players. The team has participated in various commercial and regional leagues including the National Basketball Conference in 2006, and the Liga Pilipinas in 2008. After Lando's death, the club would be took over by Cory Navarro and Mike Venezuela who is affiliated with MLV Accounting.

Maharlika Pilipinas Basketball League
The team played in the Maharlika Pilipinas Basketball League (MPBL) as the Zamboanga–Family's Brand Sardines Valientes in the 2018–19 season. The team was reportedly "relaunched" as the Zamboanga Family's Brand Sardines starting the 2019–20 season following undisclosed management issues.

Chooks-to-Go Pilipinas 3x3
The Zamboanga Valientes was among the pioneer teams of the Chooks-to-Go Pilipinas 3x3 league which played in the inaugural season in 2018.

The Family's Brand Sardines and the Valientes, which had prior shared history in the MPBL, fielded separate teams in the 2020 Chooks to Go Pilipinas 3x3 season.

For the 2020 season which was organized within a "bubble" format due to the COVID-19 pandemic, the Valientes fielded an all-Zamboangeño team, with all players native to Zamboanga City.

Pilipinas VisMin Super Cup
The Zamboanga Valientes as JPS Zamboanga City MLV fielded a team at the Pilipinas VisMin Super Cup.

PBA 3x3
Zamboanga Valientes received an invitation to participate in the inaugural season of the PBA 3x3 league in 2021. It became the first non-franchise team to confirm its participation in the PBA league. The team took a leave of absence for the second conference of the season due to its roster being hampered by injuries.

ABL 
On November 26, 2022, it was announced that the Valientes would be the Philippine representatives for the ABL Invitational 2023.

Other
After the 2020 Chooks-to-Go Pilipinas 3x3 season, Zamboanga Valientes decided to begin competing in international tournaments. They competed and won the title in the 3X3 Christmas Hustle which was organized in Canberra, Australia in December 2020.

Management
The Zamboanga Valientes is supported by local businesspeople Cory Navarro and Mike Venezuela and had sanction from former Zamboanga City mayor Beng Climaco. Joseph Romarante is the team's vice president.

Season by season

Current roster

This is the lineup of the Valientes for the 2023 ABL season.

Notable players 

 Ryan Buenafe
 Mac Cardona
 Chito Jaime
 Reed Juntilla
 Jaycee Marcelino
 Eric Rodriguez

References

Zamboanga City
Basketball teams in the Philippines
Chooks-to-Go Pilipinas 3x3 teams
National Basketball Conference teams
Liga Pilipinas teams
2006 establishments in the Philippines
Basketball teams established in 2006
PBA 3x3 teams
National Basketball League (Philippines) teams